Pithya is a genus of fungi in the family Sarcoscyphaceae. There are five species in the genus, which are widespread in northern temperate areas.

References

External links
Pithya at Index Fungorum

Sarcoscyphaceae
Pezizales genera